The Ninfe class of survey vessels  consists of two catamaran hulls operated by the Marina Militare Italiana.

Features 
They was designed to carry out hydro-oceanographic surveys at high sea and in harbours and shallow waters, in order to guarantee the production and updating of nautical charts.
Main activities:
 sounding
 minimum depth
 topography of shorelines and port facilities
 seabed features
 collection of nautical and geographical data for the updating of nautical documentation
 detection of sunken vessels or dangerous underwater obstacles
The collected data are then processed by means of dedicated software programs and then used to produce:
 paper and electronic nautical charts for the safety of navigation
 Additional Military Layers
 nautical, scientific and technical documentation for mariners
 oceanographic databases for scientific purposes

Characteristics 

It is fitted with:
 multi-beam echo sounder Simrad EM300 (30 kHz)
 single-beam echo sounder Simrad EA500 (12, 120 e 200 kHz)
 single-beam echo sounder Atlas Deso 25 (33, 100 e 210 kHz)
 Side Scan Sonar towed Simrad MS992
 differential and RTK satellite positioning systems
 Sippican XBT MK21 bathythermograph system
 CTD profiler with rosette system Ocean Seven 316 used for water sampling at different depths
 Van Veen buckets
 Sindel weather station
The ship is equipped one survey motor-boat for coastal and shallow water surveys fitted with:
 single beam Simrad EA400 (38 e 200 kHz)
 multi-beam echo sounders Simrad EM3000 (300 kHz)

Ships

References

External links 

 Aretusa (A 5304) Marina Militare website
 Galatea (A 5308) Marina Militare website

Auxiliary ships of the Italian Navy
Ships built in La Spezia
Survey ships
Auxiliary research ship classes